Dolabella auricularia, also known as the wedge sea hare, is a species of large sea slug, a marine opisthobranch gastropod mollusk in the family Aplysiidae, the sea hares.

Description 

It can be recognized by a flattened disk on the posterior surface of the animal. This species can be found with soft pustules, leading to a rather knob-like appearance. It has a short, blunt head. Its body is covered with tubercles and skin flaps. The vestigial, internal shell has a typical ear-like form. Like all sea hares, it ejects a purple ink when disturbed.

Distribution 
Dolabella auricularia can be found in the Indian Ocean and the western and NW Pacific. It is also present in the Philippines.

Habitat 
This sea hare lives in areas that are sheltered from rough currents. They will often hide in seagrass, sand and mud, feeding on algae. Intertidal rock pools are also a favoured place to live.

Human uses 
Dolabella auricularia is sometimes used by the keepers of large marine aquaria to limit algal growth in the tank. In the Philippines the eggs of the Sea Hare are eaten as a delicacy. This delicacy is called in the Philippines Lukot or Lokot.

The anti-cancer agent monomethyl auristatin E is derived from peptides found in D. auricularia.

References

External links
 

Aplysiidae
Gastropods described in 1786